is an English-born Italian-Japanese professional wrestler, currently signed to World Wonder Ring Stardom, where she is the current World of Stardom Champion in her first reign. She is also a  former Wonder of Stardom Champion, Goddess of Stardom Champion and Artist of Stardom Champion. She is also the current and founding leader of the Donna Del Mondo stable.

She formerly competed in Ice Ribbon, from her debut in 2017 up until October 2019. In Stardom, she is a one-time Wonder of Stardom Champion and a one-time Artist of Stardom Champion. Giulia was the recipient of the 2020 Tokyo Sports Women's Wrestling Grand Prize.

Early life
Giulia was born in London, England, to an Italian father and a Japanese mother, and was raised in Japan's Chiba Prefecture. She worked as a manager in an Italian restaurant before applying to train as a professional wrestler with Ice Ribbon in 2017. In an interview for Shūkan Bunshun in 2022, Giulia stated that she was a victim of bullying because of her double ethnicity, reason for which she attended a private high-school.

Professional wrestling career

Independent circuit (2017-present)
Giulia is known for competing in various promotions of the Japanese independent circuit. She made several appearances for Big Japan Pro Wrestling in events where joshi puroresu was also promoted. The first one was a house show from June 9, 2018 where she fell short to Tequila Saya. At Pro Wrestling Zero1's Tenka-Ichi Junior Tournament 2018 on November 18, she picked up a victory against Mochi Miyagi. At AWG Act In Osaka, an event promoted by Actwres girl'Z on July 21, 2019, she unsuccessfully challenged Saori Anou for the AgZ Championship.

Ice Ribbon (2017–2019)

Giulia made her professional wrestling debut at New Ice Ribbon #845, an event promoted by Ice Ribbon on October 29, 2017, teaming with the legendary Takako Inoue in a loss to Nao Date and Satsuki Totoro. In November, she entered the Young Ice Tournament where she was eliminated by Totoro in the first round. In April, she wrestled Ice Ribbon ace Tsukasa Fujimoto for the first time, losing in 39 seconds. On September 24, she defeated Asahi for her first singles victory. On October 1, she was invited by the legendary Toshiaki Kawada to compete on one of his "Holy War" produce shows, where she was defeated by veteran Command Bolshoi. Days later, she was defeated by Aja Kong in a singles match for the Oz Academy promotion. In the latter part of the year, she began a feud with Tequila Saya, which eventually bought in male wrestlers Shinya Aoki and Hideki Suzuki, who acted as mentors for the female wrestlers and taught them new moves throughout their feud. After a match on December 31 where Saya and Suzuki were defeated by Giulia and Aoki, the two women reconciled and formed a tag team known as "Burning Raw". At the end of the year, she was presented with Ice Ribbon's "New Face" award, the equivalent of winning rookie of the year. On January 27, Burning Raw unsuccessfully challenged Kyuri and Maika Ozaki for the International Ribbon Tag Team Championship. After February 17, she announced she would be taking a month off from pro wrestling due to nerve damage in her hip. After returning, she began a feud with Maya Yukihi, which culminated in Giulia unsuccessfully challenging for the ICE Cross Infinity Championship on May 25. In July, Burning Raw defeated Yukihi and Risa Sera to win the International Ribbon Tag Team Championship. After 3 months as champions, they dropped the titles back to Yukihi and Sera on September 23. In a surprise announcement on October 13, Giulia announced she would abruptly be leaving Ice Ribbon.

World Wonder Ring Stardom (2019–present)
On October 14, 2019, Giulia announced that she had signed with World Wonder Ring Stardom. On December 8, Giulia made her in-ring debut on Stardom where she defeated Hazuki. 

During January 2020, Giulia formed a new unit named Donna Del Mondo, recruiting Maika and Syuri to the stable in the process. On February 8, Donna del Mondo defeated Queen's Quest (AZM, Momo Watanabe and Utami Hayashishita) to win the Artist of Stardom Championship. On March 24, Giulia defeated Jungle Kyona, Momo Watanabe, fellow Donna del Mondo stablemate Syuri, and finally Natsuko Tora to be crowned the 2020 Cinderella Tournament winner. On July 26 at Stardom Cinderella Summer In Tokyo, Giulia defeated Tam Nakano to win the vacant Wonder of Stardom Championship. On October 3, Giulia had her first successful title defense where she defeated Nakano in a rematch. On November 14, Donna del Mondo lost the Artist of Stardom Championship to Oedo Tai's (Bea Priestley, Saki Kashima and Natsuko Tora). At Stardom Sendai Cinderella 2020 on November 15, Giulia successfully defended the Wonder of Stardom Championship against Konami. On December 20, Giulia defended the Wonder of Stardom Championship in a title vs. title match against fellow Donna del Mondo member Syuri who defended the SWA World Championship. The match ended in a time-limit draw, with both titleholders retaining their titles in the process. On November 8, 2020, on the finals of the Goddesses of Stardom Tag League, she teamed up with Maika with whom she previously won the Red Goddesses Block and fell short to AZM and Momo Watanabe.

On March 3, 2021, at All Star Dream Cinderella, Giulia was defeated by Tam Nakano in a Hair vs. Hair Match for the Wonder of Stardom Championship, ending her reign at 220 days. Post-match, she had her head partially shaved in the ring, with the rest cut off backstage. At Stardom Yokohama Dream Cinderella 2021 on April 4, 2021, Giulia teamed up with Syuri to win the Goddess of Stardom Championship from fellow Donna Del Mondo members Maika and Himeka after an intern stable clash. She and Syuri would later name their tag team "Alto Livello Kabaliwan", sometimes shortened as ALK, meaning High Level Madness. On the first night of the Stardom Cinderella Tournament 2021 from April 10, Giulia picked a victory over Ruaka in the first rounds of the tournament. On the second night of the tournament which took place on May 14, Maika defeated Giulia in the semi-finals. At Yokohama Dream Cinderella 2021 in Summer on July 4, Giulia and Syuri successfully defended their Goddess of Stardom Championship against Stars (Mayu Iwatani and Koguma). Giulia took part in the Stardom 5 Star Grand Prix 2021, competing in the "red stars" block but pulled out of the tournament after three matches due to dealing with several injuries. She missed the Stardom 10th Anniversary Grand Final Osaka Dream Cinderella show from October 9 and all three of the Stardom Super Wars shows in the process. She made her in-ring return on December 29 at Stardom Dream Queendom where she successfully picked up a victory against Konami who was departing from the promotion.

At Stardom Award in Shinjuku on January 3, 2022, Giulia revealed Thekla from Ice Ribbon and Mirai from Tokyo Joshi Pro Wrestling as the two masked superstars who kept attacking various other wrestlers at the end of 2021. All three of them teamed up to defeat Tam Nakano, Mai Sakurai and Unagi Sayaka in a Six-Woman Tag Team Match. At Stardom Nagoya Supreme Fight on January 29, 2022, Giulia battled Mayu Iwatani into a time-limit draw in a number one contendership match for the World of Stardom Championship which solded with an opportunity for both of them at Stardom World Climax. At Stardom Cinderella Journey on  February 23, 2022, Giulia teamed up with Thekla and Mirai and went into a time-limit draw against Maika, Himeka and Syuri. On the first night of the Stardom World Climax 2022 from March 26, Giulia unsuccessfully challenged Syuri for the World of Stardom Championship. After their match, Syuri announced she will leave Donna Del Mondo to walk on her path and form another stable which she later revealed as being God's Eye. On the second night from March 27, Giulia teamed up with Maika, Himeka and Thekla to take out Prominence's Risa Sera, Suzu Suzuki, Akane Fujita and Mochi Miyagi with whom all the Donna Del Mondo members have been in a feud. However, Suzu Suzuki stated that she was not finished with Giulia despite her unit's loss, hinting that the feud was still standing. At the Stardom Cinderella Tournament 2022, Giulia reached the second rounds on April 10, where she fell short to Koguma. At Stardom Golden Week Fight Tour on May 5, 2022, Giulia teamed up with Himeka, Natsupoi and Mai Sakurai in a losing effort against God's Eye (Syuri, Mirai, Ami Sourei and Konami). At Stardom Flashing Champions on May 28, 2022, Giulia teamed up with Mai Sakurai to unsuccessfully face Hazuki and Koguma for the Goddess of Stardom Championship. At Stardom Fight in the Top on June 26, 2022, Giulia is set to team up with Maika and Mai Sakurai to challenge Oedo Tai (Saki Kashima, Momo Watanabe and Starlight Kid), and God's Eye (Syuri, Mirai and Ami Sourei) in a three-way match for the Artist of Stardom Championship. She was announced compete in the Stardom 5 Star Grand Prix 2022 on July 30. She won the whole comptition on the last day of the tournament from October 1 by defeating Tam Nakano. On December 29, at Dream Queendom 2, Giulia defeated Syuri to win the World of Stardom Championship for the first time in her career.

New Japan Pro-Wrestling (2020–2022)
Giulia took part in exhibition matches organized by New Japan Pro-Wrestling in relationship with World Wonder Ring Stardom to promote female talent. In her first match, she teamed up with Hana Kimura in a losing effort to Mayu Iwatani and Arisa Hoshiki in the first night of Wrestle Kingdom 14 on January 4, 2020. On January 5, 2021, in the second night of Wrestle Kingdom 15, she teamed up with fellow Donna del Mondo stable member Syuri to defeat Mayu Iwatani and Tam Nakano. On the second night of the Wrestle Grand Slam in MetLife Dome from September 4, Giulia teamed up with Syuri to defeat Momo Watanabe and Saya Kamitani. At Historic X-Over on November 20, 2022, she teamed up with Zack Sabre Jr. and defeated Syuri and Tom Lawlor in a mixed tag team match.

Championships and accomplishments
Ice Ribbon
International Ribbon Tag Team Championship (1 time) – with Tequila Saya

Pro Wrestling Illustrated
Ranked No. 16 of the top 150 female singles wrestlers in the PWI Women's 150 in 2021
Ranked No. 5 of the top 50 Tag Teams in the PWI Tag Team 50 in 2021 – 

Tokyo Sports
Women's Wrestling Grand Prize (2020)
Weekly Pro-Wrestling
Women's Professional Wrestling Grand Prix (2020)

World Wonder Ring Stardom
Artist of Stardom Championship (1 time) – with Maika and Syuri
Goddess of Stardom Championship (1 time) – with Syuri
Wonder of Stardom Championship (1 time)
World of Stardom Championship (1 time, current)
Cinderella Tournament (2020)
5★Star GP (2022)
5★Star GP Award (1 time)
5★Star GP Best Match Award 
Stardom Year-End Award (5 times)
Best Match Award (2021) – 
Best Match Award (2022) – 
Best Unit Award (2020) 
MVP Award (2020)
Shining Award (2020)

Luchas de Apuestas record

References

1994 births
Living people
Japanese people of Italian descent
Japanese female professional wrestlers
People from Chiba Prefecture
Sportspeople from Chiba Prefecture
21st-century professional wrestlers
Wonder of Stardom Champions
Goddess of Stardom Champions
Artist of Stardom Champions